Artur Golański (born 25 April 1992) is a Polish professional footballer who plays as a midfielder for GKS Bełchatów.

Career

Club
In June 2010, he signed a three-year contract with ŁKS Łódź.

On 29 July 2020, he signed with Chojniczanka Chojnice. A year later, he moved to GKS Bełchatów.

References

External links 
 

1992 births
People from Łask
Sportspeople from Łódź Voivodeship
Living people
Polish footballers
Poland youth international footballers
Association football forwards
ŁKS Łódź players
GKS Bełchatów players
Chojniczanka Chojnice players
Ekstraklasa players
I liga players
II liga players
III liga players